Richard Adkerson is the current president, CEO and vice chairman of Freeport-McMoRan Copper & Gold Inc. with an established career in the mining sector. He has been in this role since December 2003. He is also known for his past role as chairman of the International Council on Mining and Metals.

Education
Adkerson graduated with highest honours from Mississippi State University with a bachelor's degree in accounting in 1970. He attended the six-week advanced management program at Harvard Business School.

Career 
Adkerson started out as an accountant in the unpredictable oil and gas business throughout the 1970s before being offered his first role at Freeport in 1989. He was a partner and managing director at Arthur Andersen where he managed the company’s oil and gas industry division. Between 1976 and 1978, he was a professional accounting fellow with the Securities and Exchange Commission in Washington, D.C.

Adkerson was the past chairman of the International Council on Mining and Metals and is currently a member of the Council on Foreign Relations, The Business Council, and the Business Roundtable. He serves on the advisory council of the Kissinger Institute on China and the United States and as a member of the Clinton Global Initiative.

He serves on the board of directors of the Arizona Commerce Authority, Greater Phoenix Leadership, and the Greater Phoenix Economic Council. He is vice chairman of the National World War II Museum, and also serves on the board of visitors of the MD Anderson Cancer Center in Houston, Texas. Additionally, he is a member of the Mississippi State University Foundation’s board of directors.

The Phoenix Business Journal wrote in November 2014 that Adkerson made $55 million that year, ranking him as the third highest paid US executive.

Recognition
Adkerson received The American Institute of Mining, Metallurgical and Petroleum Engineers Charles F. Rand Memorial Award in 2011 and was named Executive of the Year by the W. P. Carey School of Business Dean’s Council at Arizona State University in 2010. He has been named The Best CEO in Metals and Mining by Institutional Investor magazine for four years running and was named The Copper Man of the Year 2009 by The Copper Club.

Personal life
Adkerson lives in Phoenix, Arizona. Sun Ranch Partners, managed by Adkerson, purchased the eponymous  near Cameron, Montana in 2010.

References

Living people
American accountants
Mississippi State University alumni
American chief executives
Year of birth missing (living people)